Andakara Prastawa Dhyaksa, known as Prastawa, (born in Jakarta, 16 August 1992) is an Indonesian professional basketball player who currently plays for the Pelita Jaya Jakarta.

He was voted NBL's 'Rookie of the Year' in 2013.
In an IBL 2016 Series 4 game against Satria Muda Pertamina on 19 March 2016 in Semarang, M88 Aspac was trailing by four points in the last minutes of the fourth quarter. With seconds left, Prastawa made a contested three-point shot while being fouled, and then made a free-throw attempt to complete a four-point play and save Aspac from loss. He became a hero later that night after scoring another three-pointer in overtime to help Aspac defeat Satria Muda Pertamina with a score 81–72. He totalled 24 points to become the 'Man of the Match.'

Professional career

NBL& IBL 
In his first season he achieved 'Six Man of the Year'. He also became ASPAC club champion. He defended manji NBL Indonesia 2012–2013 season and almost won the MVP and top player in the NBL Score Indonesia that season. Child Of The ASPAC Dell coach once in high school and he entered the club 03 Jakarta Indonesia Muda when a Junior.

In March 2014 – 2015 NBL Season, he scored a career high of 32 points against Pelita Jaya but still lost the game 74–78. During that season he led his team with most points, averaging 11.8 points. However, Aspac lost to Stadium Jakarta during the championship series.

During the 2016 IBL Indonesia season, Prastawa averaged 14.7 points—second in the league behind Jamarr Andre Johnson. Aspac didn't qualify for the finals having lost to Pelita Jaya in a best of three series. Pelita Jaya advanced to the finals after winning the series 2–0.

Walikota Cup 
Prastawa got a contract to play in the 2016 Walikota Cup Surabaya. He played alongside fellow first team in M88 Aspac is Oki Wira Sanjaya.

International
Prastawa debuted for the national team of Indonesia in the current basketball arena. In the Islamic Solidarity Games in Palembang in 2013, he managed to win a bronze medal for the national team Indonesia.  name is now also included in the 12 names below to Myanmar in the event the SEA GAMES.

Career Statistics

NBL/IBL

Regular season

Playoffs

External links
 NBL Indonesia profile page

References

1992 births
Living people
Asian Games competitors for Indonesia
Basketball players at the 2018 Asian Games
Competitors at the 2015 Southeast Asian Games
Competitors at the 2017 Southeast Asian Games
Competitors at the 2019 Southeast Asian Games
Indonesian men's basketball players
Point guards
Southeast Asian Games medalists in basketball
Southeast Asian Games silver medalists for Indonesia
Sportspeople from Jakarta
Islamic Solidarity Games competitors for Indonesia
Competitors at the 2021 Southeast Asian Games
Southeast Asian Games gold medalists for Indonesia
21st-century Indonesian people